The Rural Municipality of Cupar No. 218 is a rural municipality (RM) in the Canadian province of Saskatchewan within Census Division No. 6 and  Division No. 2.

History 
The RM of Cupar No. 218 incorporated as a rural municipality on December 13, 1909.

Heritage properties
There are two historical sites located within the RM.
Gregherd School Site - Constructed in 1914, the site contains a one-room school house and monument.
Wheatwyn Church (also called the Wheatwyn Lutheran Church or Zion Lutheran Church) - Established in 1906 - 1907 and constructed of field stone, the church is of a Gothic Vernacular style.

Geography

Communities and localities 
The following urban municipalities lie within the RM.

Towns
Southey
Cupar

Villages
Markinch

Demographics 

Government 
The RM of Cupar No. 218 is governed by an elected municipal council and an appointed administrator that meets on the second Friday of every month. The reeve of the RM is Raymond Orb while its administrator is Nicole Czemeres. The RM's office is located in Cupar.

References 

C
 
Division No. 6, Saskatchewan